"Nagging" is a song recorded by South Korean singers IU and Lim Seulong. Written by Kim Eana and composed by Lee Min-soo, the pop ballad duet was used as one of the theme songs for the second season of the variety show, We Got Married, along with "We Fell in Love" by Jo Kwon and Ga-in.

The song was released on June 3, 2010 and was re-released under the title  on December 14, 2011 as part of IU's first Japanese extended play  I□U (2011).

Release and reception
"Nagging" is a pop ballad. The song was a commercial success in South Korea. The single debuted at twelve on the Gaon Digital Chart and shot up to number-one position the following week, where it remained for three weeks.

Track listing

Awards and nominations

See also
List of Gaon Digital Chart number ones of 2010

References

2010 singles
2010 songs
Gaon Digital Chart number-one singles
IU (singer) songs
Songs with lyrics by Kim Eana